Zirkelite is an oxide mineral with the chemical formula . It occurs as well-formed fine sized isometric crystals. It is a black, brown or yellow mineral with a hardness of 5.5 and a specific gravity of 4.7.

Name and discovery
Zirkelite was first discovered in Brazil in 1895. It was named for German petrographer Ferdinand Zirkel (1838–1912).

Occurrence
Initial discovery was from the Jacupiranga carbonatite, Sao Paulo, Brazil. It is also found in Canada, Kazakhstan, Norway, Russia, South Africa, the United Kingdom, and the United States.

See also
 List of minerals named after people

References

Webmineral data
Mindat localities
Mineral Data Publishing

Calcium minerals
Thorium minerals
Zirconium minerals
Titanium minerals
Niobium minerals
Lanthanide minerals
Cubic minerals
Minerals in space group 225
Oxide minerals
Minerals described in 1895